Rodolfo dos Santos Soares, or simply Rodolfo Soares (born May 20, 1985) is a Brazilian football who plays as a defender for Maltese club Gżira United.

Club career
On 12 May 2018, he signed a two-year contract with Gżira United.

References

External links
Vejle Boldklub profile

1985 births
Footballers from Rio de Janeiro (city)
Living people
Brazilian footballers
Association football midfielders
Brazilian expatriate footballers
Fluminense FC players
Joinville Esporte Clube players
Vejle Boldklub players
Al Kharaitiyat SC players
Al Ahed FC players
Canoas Sport Club players
Hibernians F.C. players
Gżira United F.C. players
Danish Superliga players
Qatar Stars League players
Lebanese Premier League players
Maltese Premier League players
Expatriate men's footballers in Denmark
Expatriate footballers in Malta
Expatriate footballers in Qatar
Expatriate footballers in Lebanon
Brazilian expatriate sportspeople in Denmark
Brazilian expatriate sportspeople in Malta